Troy Gordon Corser (born 27 November 1971) is an Australian former professional motorcycle road racer. He competed in the Superbike World Championship from 1992 to 2011 except for the 1997 season when he competed in Grand Prix motorcycle racing. He held the record for most World Superbike Championship race starts with 377 until 2023 when another Superbike legend Jonathan Rea overtook him.

Career
Corser was born in Wollongong, New South Wales, Australia. Pole for the first round showed his potential, although he only took one podium until his win at round 5 at the Salzburgring (partly due to collisions with Anthony Gobert and Piergorgio Bontempi at Monza). A strong remainder of the season (including a win at Laguna Seca, one of the few tracks on the schedule that he knew) saw him beat Aaron Slight to 2nd overall.

He led the standings before the final round, took pole, but crashing and breaking ribs in a warm-up accident. For  he was teamed with Carl Fogarty on Davide Tardozzi's team, the title going to Foggy with Corser again third. In  and  he was on a factory Aprilia RSV-Mille. He would take the Aprilia to its  first WSBK wins in 2000, and opened 2001 with a double victory in South Africa, but a double DNF at Monza scuppered his hopes of a championship challenge.

He finished 9th in the 2004 championship, with a best result of 3rd, but chose to leave the team after this.

In  he raced for the Alstare Suzuki Team on the GSX-R1000 which enabled him to regain his position as Superbike World Champion, winning the championship after a run of early-season victories - later in the season Chris Vermeulen and Noriyuki Haga were usually the men to beat.

A double non-finish at Assen with 4 rounds to go left him 5th in the championship, behind Bayliss, James Toseland, Noriyuki Haga and Andrew Pitt. He ultimately overhauled Pitt to finish 4th, through a double podium at the final round.

For  he left Suzuki to join Yamaha, however he was outpaced by teammate Noriyuki Haga and finished 5th overall, with eight podiums but no wins.

For the 2009 WSBK season Corser signed with BMW to ride alongside Ruben Xaus on BMW's new superbike. His best result in the first half of the season was an 8th place in the opener at Philip Island, although there were several other minor points finishes. Strong results later in the season saw him finish 13th overall.

Corser and Xaus continued with the team for 2010. Corser scored two fifth places at Assen, he took BMW's first ever WSBK podium in race two at Monza, aided by a first-lap collision between Xaus, Jonathan Rea and Toseland. He also took pole at Misano and had scored in every race until being forced to miss Brno following a practice crash.

Troy has been on pole at Philip Island and Valencia four times, equalling a championship record for a single track. Of the eight cases of a rider having 10 or more podium finishes at a particular circuit, Troy has four - 13 at Misano, 11 each at Laguna Seca and Philip Island, and 10 at Donington Park.

Career statistics

Superbike World Championship

Races by year
(key) (Races in bold indicate pole position, races in italics indicate fastest lap)

References

External links 
 troycorser11.com Official website

1971 births
Living people
Australian motorcycle racers
Superbike World Championship riders
500cc World Championship riders
AMA Superbike Championship riders
Sportspeople from Wollongong